James Noel may refer to:

James Latane Noel Jr. (1909–1997), American federal judge
James Noel (basketball) (born 1982), British basketball player
James Noël (poet) (born 1978), Haitian poet and writer